The 21-year period of Philippine economic history during Ferdinand Marcos’ regime – from his election in 1965 until he was ousted by the People Power Revolution in 1986 – was a period of significant economic lows.

The early part of Ferdinand Marcos' administration continued the rising growth rate which characterized the previous administrations of the Third Philippine Republic, peaking at nearly 9 percent in 1973 and 1976. However, Marcos' later years in power saw the worst recession in Philippine history, with the economy contracting by 7.3% in 1984 and again in 1985.

The dramatic rise and fall of the Philippine economy during this period is attributed to the Marcos administration's heavy dependence on foreign loans (debt-driven as opposed to productivity-driven growth), its policy of establishing monopolies under Marcos cronies which resulted in significant income inequality, corruption by government officials, and the capital flight which has historically been attributed to the Marcos family's economic plunder.

Background: Economy of the Philippines before 1965 

Before Marcos first became President in 1965, Diosdado Macapagal had ended his term with the Philippines already the 7th largest economy in Asia by GDP, and 30th largest economy by GDP worldwide.

During the 1960s up to the declaration of Martial Law, the Philippine economy was primarily agricultural with 60% of the labor force working in 1957 and 1964. Following an economic strategy of import substitution industrialization, the Philippine economy before Marcos was characterized by growing industrial production in sectors including textiles, clothing, metalworks, machinery and petroleum products.

New high-yielding crop varieties and new irrigation and mechanization techniques brought growth to the Agriculture sector. International collaboration for new agricultural technologies was pursued, most notably with the International Rice Research Institute founded in 1960 under the administration of Carlos P. Garcia.

Many sectors of the Philippine economy were controlled by the traditional elite, who had become powerful during the Spanish and American occupations of the Philippines and had since become major players in Philippine politics.

Within this sociopolitical climate, Ferdinand Marcos, the scion of a political clan from Northern Luzon, was able to deftly portray himself as an outsider, using his finely honed oratorical skills to promise what one historian would describe as "dazzling visions of rapid growth, impending development, and the alleviation of poverty."

By picking Fernando Lopez as his running mate, gaining early support from the Iglesia ni Cristo voting bloc, and drawing on the propaganda value of his beauty queen wife Imelda, who charmed the vote-rich provinces of her native Visayas, Marcos won the 1965 Philippine presidential election against incumbent Diosdado Macapagal and independent challenger Raul Manglapus.

Economic strategies during Marcos' first term (1965–1969) 

Marcos had built his campaign on the promise that his administration would change the face of the Philippine economy and government. Marcos had inherited an economy which was growing at a steady pace, but he managed to give the impression of even quicker results by drawing on foreign loans to fund projects. He also attracted a new breed of economic managers to work under his administration. These highly educated soon became known as Marcos’ "technocrats."
With these technocrats in the public sector, Marcos sought to also reshape the private sector by taking advantage of the then-highly regulated economy to favor a select group of businessmen and industrialists who were loyal to him. This marked the beginning of what would later be called "crony capitalism," and would later be regarded as the replacement of one set of elites with another. But the short-term gains of his loan-fueled policies kept Marcos popular with the public throughout most of his first term. This popularity lasted until the very end of his campaign for reelection, where excessive campaign spending led to a balance of payments crisis as the country ushered in the 1970s.

Buildup of economic control 
Upon assuming the presidency in 1965, Marcos immediately embarked on a set of political maneuvers designed to undermine the economic power and political influence of the Philippines’ traditional elite, and replace them with individuals loyal to him.

With strategic appointments and the systematic use of what would later be called "behest loans" he elevated the influence of a select group of industrialists and entrepreneurs  such as Roberto Benedicto who was put in charge of the then-government-owned Philippine National Bank, and Rodolfo Cuenca, whose Cuenca Construction Company was expanded into what became the Construction and Development Corporation of the Philippines in 1966.  These were the first among the group that would later be referred to as Marcos’ "cronies."

In an effort to undermine the power of local feudal lords, Marcos appointed young technocrat Ernesto Maceda to the newly created Presidential Arm on Community Development, which would conduct development projects directly in Philippine barrios, instead of going through local politicians.

Some of Marcos’ most prominent early appointments earned him praise however, for bringing in a "new breed" of economic managers.  Marcos’ campaign promises proved very attractive to a new generation of "technocrats" - highly trained specialists and economic managers.  Among these "technocrats" were Vicente Paterno, Rafael Salas, Alejandro Melchor, Onofre D. Corpuz, Cesar Virata, and Gerardo Sicat, who became the intellectual core of Marcos’ cabinet.

Omnibus Tax Law of 1969 
One major economic achievement of the first Marcos administration arose from placing tax reform in its legislative agenda. Because landlords dominated the legislature, no new tax initiatives since midway into the term of Carlos P. Garcia, in 1959. The Macapagal administration had gone by with no new tax laws passed at all. As a result, by the end of the 1960s, 70 to 75% of the country's tax revenues were being derived only from indirect taxes.

This success came towards the end of Marcos’ first term, however, and even then, the new revenues it brought in were insufficient for Marcos’ government spending plans, which were central to his campaign for reelection. As a result, the Marcos administration relied heavily on foreign assistance throughout his first term, with the number of projects ramping up as he neared the end of his first term in 1969.

Deficit spending and foreign loans in Marcos’ first presidential term 

In a bid to become the first Philippine president to be elected to a second term, Marcos initiated a program of rapid modernization to back up his 1969 campaign theme, "performance." The government’s spending deficit in the first Marcos administration from 1965 to 1969 was 70% higher than that of the Macapagal administration from 1961 to 1965. In order to do this, Marcos relied heavily on foreign loans, and economists would later point to the period of fiscal policy from 1966 to 1970 as the root of problems that would bring about problems of the Philippine economy in the late 1970s, the 1980s, and beyond.

Marcos had quantified his promise of "performance" as "Rice ,Roads, and Schoolbuildings," and he used loans to fulfill those promises. Loans mostly funded the construction of 1,201 km new asphalt roads where the more fiscally conservative Macapagal administration had only managed to build 70; 2,124 km of gravel roads were built where the Macapagal government had managed only 118; and 15,831 lineal meters of bridges where Macapagal had only built 651. This loan-driven spending also allowed Marcos to construct 38, 705 permanent schoolbuildings and 58,745 prefabricated schoolbuildings in his first three years, while the Macapagal administration had only managed to build 400 classrooms in its four years.

Marcos had the fortune of benefitting from his predecessors’ investments in the area of rice production. The International Rice Research Institute had been conceived in Garcia’s term, and during Macapagal’s term, work on the development of a new rice variety, IR8, began.  This higher yield variety was introduced during Marcos’ term as "Miracle Rice" and produced a boom rice production so large that the Philippines was able to export US$5.9 Million worth of rice in 1968.

Edifice complex 

Marcos’ first term also saw the practice of using publicly funded construction projects as political and election propaganda. Usually attributed to First Lady Imelda Marcos, these grandiosely designed projects were eventually called part of her "Edifice complex".

The 1969 reelection campaign and the balance of payments crisis 

The Philippine economy under Ferdinand Marcos faced its first major economic crisis because of a ramp-up on loan-funded government spending leading up to Ferdinand Marcos’ 1969 reelection campaign.

Leaning even more on foreign aid funds to assure his re-election to a second term, Marcos launched US$50 million worth in infrastructure projects in 1969 to create an impression of progress for the electorate.

This campaign spending spree was so massive that it caused a balance of payments crisis, so the government was compelled to seek a debt rescheduling plan with the International Monetary Fund. The IMF mandated stabilization plan which accompanied the agreement included numerous macroeconomic interventions, including a shift away from the Philippines’ historical economic strategy of import substitution industrialization and towards export-oriented industrialization; and the allowing the Philippine Peso to float and devalue. The inflationary effect these interventions had on the local economy brought about the social unrest which was the rationalization for the proclamation of martial law in 1972.

Economic strategies during Marcos' second term (1969–1972) 
The second term of the presidency of Ferdinand Marcos began in 1969. The social impact of the 1969–1970 balance of payments crisis quickly led to social unrest – so much so that Marcos went from winning the elections by a landslide in November 1969 to dodging effigies by protesters just two months later, in January 1970.

Despite the crisis, the administration continued its strategy of using foreign loans to funded industrialization projects, encouraged by low interest rates in international capital markets. Philippine external debt was at $4.1 billion in 1975, but doubled to $8.2 billion in only two years.

Social unrest 

The social impact of the 1969–1970 balance of payments crisis was rapid, as was its effect on Marcos’ popularity. The election was held on 11 November 1969 and Marcos won handily over his opponent Serging Osmeña. Marcos was inaugurated to his second presidential term on 30 December 1969, and by the time he gave his Fifth State of the Nation Address (the first of his second term) on 26 January 1970, he was already beset by multi-sectoral protests which included the "radicals" of the left and the "moderates" being civil libertarians and some segments of the religious sector.

Marcos increasingly blamed this social unrest to the machinations of the still-new Communist Party of the Philippines, which had just been born the year before, splitting from the dying Partido Komunisa ng Pilipinas., and its armed wing, the New People’s Army (CPP-NPA).  Neither the Philippine National Security Council nor the Philippine National Security Council which shaped US involvement in Philippine security affairs at the time considered the CPP-NPA a major threat, but Marcos continued to use it as a bogeyman, harkening Filipinos to images of the bloody Huk encounters of the 1950s, and courting the Johnson administration's political support in light of the U.S.' recent entry into the Vietnam war. Marcos’ mythicization of the CPP led to its rapid growth in the early 1970s, and Marcos went even further by using the CPP as part of his rationalization for martial law in 1972.

Petrodollar-loan fueled spending
Although the Philippines was facing an economic crisis of the early 1970s, the Marcos administration continued its strategy of building loan-funded infrastructure and industrial projects because the international capital markets were then flooded with "petrodollars". Oil producing countries had been making so much profit that they were eager to put their money in countries they considered "investment havens".

Philippine external debt was at $4.1 billion in 1975, but doubled to $8.2 billion in only two years.
Loans with low interest rates fueled by these petrodollars funded the 11 major industrial projects Marcos announced in his 1970 State of the Nation Address, as well as roads, bridges, dams, irrigation systems, communications infrastructure, power plants, and electrical transmission facilities.

By 1982, the Philippines’ debt had ballooned to $24.4 billion.

Buildup to martial law
The political and economic unrest of the early 1970s continued throughout the three and a half years of Marcos’ second term, just as rumors proliferated that he would try to remain in power beyond the two terms allowed him by the 1935 Constitution of the Philippines. Factory workers and transport groups protested against low wages and unfair labor practices.  Students, disenchanted with Marcos, joined the labor workers in the streets.

Marcos’ move to create a new Philippine Constitution by pushing for the creation of the 1971 Philippine Constitutional Convention lent credence to the belief that Marcos wanted to stay in power, especially when delegate Eduardo Quintero implicated Imelda Marcos in a payoff scheme for delegates who voted against the "Block Marcos" amendments which would disallow Marcos from running again.

When a political rally of the Liberal Party at Plaza Miranda to announce its slate for the Philippine Senate election of 1971 was bombed with grenades, Marcos accused the Communist Party of the Philippines and temporarily suspended the Writ of Habeas Corpus in a supposed bid to apprehend the assailants. Although the actual instigator of the bombing remains the subject of historical debate, it prompted a series of large protests by Civil Libertarians, led by Senator Jose Diokno, which would last until martial law was proclaimed in 1972.

The Plaza Miranda bombing would soon be followed by 20 more in the 1972 Manila bombings, which caused significant property damage but only forty casualties in one instance. Only one assailant was arrested for these bombings – a bomb expert previously connected with the Philippine Constabulary.
Marcos continued to blame communist guerillas for the attacks, and they became part of the justification for the declaration of martial law in September 1972.

The Philippine economy under martial law (1972–1981) 

Marcos declared martial law in September 1972, and because he packaged it as a way of introducing stability in light of the social unrest that had been going on since the 1970 balance of payments crisis, the business community mostly supported the move at first.  The economy continued to grow because of an international boom in the demand for key Philippine export commodities, especially sugar and coconut. This international commodities boom led to record GNP growth in the country 1974 and 1976, despite the economic headaches brought about by the 1973 Oil Crisis.
By the late 1970s, however, the international commodities boom began to slow down, and the petro-dollar glut that had fueled low interest rates led international financing institutions to begin tightening credit, forcing the government to resort to short-term loans with higher interest rates just to service its debts and to import goods. The Philippines’ debt went up to more than 200 percent of exports in the period from 1978 to 1991, so more than half the value of the country's exports went to debt servicing, rather than imports. 
 
Marcos’ debt fueled spending, which had grown significantly during the first few years after the declaration of martial law, had funded projects which did not produce economic returns. Some of these projects were simply not yet needed at the time, while some were showcase projects which did not address the more urgent need for basic primary services. But the failure of most of the martial law era projects has been attributed to the incompetence and/or corruption of the Marcos cronies that had been put in monopolistic control over them.

Corruption contributed to significant capital flight, and even Marcos’ immediate family were accused of participating in the plunder of the Philippine economy, with some estimates placing their "unexplained wealth" at US$10 billion.

The country was hit hard by the second global oil crisis of the decade, in 1979. And when the US Federal Reserve raised interest rates in the early 1980s, the Philippines’ debt ballooned rapidly, pushing the Philippine economy towards an economic nosedive by 1983.

Achieving control of the economy 
At 7:15 PM on 23 September 1972, Marcos went on air to announce that he had proclaimed martial law throughout the Philippines. The Military had begun rounding up journalists, political leaders, key opposition figures, and even some delegates to the constitutional convention – anyone who could pose a challenge to Marcos' control of the government and the economy. Then Defense Secretary and later became Minister Juan Ponce Enrile, who was in charge of the arrests, later recounted that they had to "emasculate the leaders" to achieve total control of the country.
Although he originally justified it on the basis of supposed threats to the national government, Marcos soon framed the declaration of Martial Law in 1972 as an effort to create a "New Society", promising economic growth and making it more acceptable to the business and international community while allowing Marcos even more control over the Philippine economy.

As Dohner and Intal explain in their 1989 book on the economic history of Southeast Asia: 

Martial law allowed Marcos to immediately take control of privately controlled public utilities such as Meralco, PLDT, and the three then-existing Philippine airline services, and media entities, including 7 Television Stations, 16 National Daily Newspapers, 11 Weekly Magazines, 66 Community Newspapers, and 292 radio stations.

Expansion of crony capitalism

Because martial law gave Marcos extraordinary legislative as well as executive powers, he was eventually able to expand the influence of his cronies, who quickly establish monopolies within the Philippine economy, in a strategy for economic control which would eventually come to be called "crony capitalism". Using presidential decrees and letters of instruction, he enabled Juan Ponce Enrile to control the logging industry, Danding Cojuangco to control the coconut farming industry, Roberto Benedicto to dominate the sugar industry, Antonio Floirendo to control the banana farming industry, and so on.

Global commodities boom and debt-driven GDP growth 
The Philippines' exports income had begun growing in the early 1970s due to an increased global demand for raw materials, including coconut and sugar, and the increase in global market prices for these commodities coincided with the declaration of martial law, allowing GDP growth to peak at nearly 9 percent in the years immediately after the declaration – in 1973 and 1976. This "commodities boom" continued throughout most of the 1970s, only slowing down towards the early 1980s when it left the Philippine economy vulnerable to the instability of the international capital market.

Manufactured exports became a significant growth area, growing at twice the rate of the agricultural exports which had been the Philippines’ traditional export products.
The Marcos administration continued its strategy of relying on international loans to fund the projects that would support the booming economy, prompting later economists to label this a period of "debt driven" growth.

Export-oriented industrialization and labor policy 
The austerity package required by IMF in the government’s deal to solve the 1969–1970 balance of payments crisis was supposed to be implemented during Marcos’ second term, but the shift from the Philippines’ historical policy of import substitution industrialization and towards export-oriented industrialization began being implemented in earnest in the months immediately prior and after martial law.

The first signs of a major shift came with the creation of an export processing zones in Mariveles, Bataan and later, similar zones in Mactan, Baguio and Cavite. Marcos cracked down on labor protests, with the implementation of a "no-union, no-strike" policy.

1973 oil crisis 
The Philippine economy took a big hit during the 1973 oil crisis, but the commodities boom kept the economy afloat.

Corruption and downturn (1977–1981) 
By the late 1970s, however, the sugar and coconut commodities boom began to slow down, and the weaknesses of the Philippine economy under martial law began to be exposed. This period also saw the end of the petro-dollar glut which had fueled low interest rates, and international financing institutions began tightening credit, forcing the government to resort to short-term loans with higher interest rates just to service its debts and to import goods.

The Philippines’ debt went up to more than 200 percent of exports in the period from 1978 to 1991, so more than half the value of the country’s exports went to debt servicing, rather than imports. By contrast, Thailand and Korea, which did not borrow heavily despite the low interest rates of the early 1970s, fared better in the long-run.

Crony capitalism, corruption, and capital flight 
Many of the projects undertaken by the cronies did not produce economic returns, partly because of corruption, and partly because the cronies were selected primarily because of their loyalty to Marcos, rather than any kind of proven business acumen. In addition, some of these projects were simply not yet needed at the time, while some were showcase projects that did not address the more urgent need for basic primary services.

Marcos used government-owned financial institutions such as the Philippine National Bank to bail out many these crony-owned firms, compounding the country's economic difficulties.

The late 1970s also saw the rise of capital flight linked to corruption, as funds funneled from government projects were stashed in overseas bank accounts in Switzerland, the US, and the Netherlands Antilles among others. Marcos' immediate family – particularly Imelda, Imee, and Bongbong – would later be accused of participating in the plunder of the Philippine economy, with some estimates placing their "unexplained wealth" at US$10 billion.

1979 oil crisis 
The Philippines was hit hard by the second global oil crisis of the decade, in 1979. The country had weathered the first global oil crisis, in 1973, but by 1979 the commodities boom which had propped up its economy in the early 1970s had died down, leaving the Philippines much more vulnerable - so much so that in the third quarter of 1981, the Philippine economy followed the course of the US economy when it went into recession.

Economic nosedive and Marcos ouster (1981–1986)

Debt servicing crisis 
The Philippine economic nosedive of 1983 traces its roots to debt-driven growth, mostly during Marcos' second term and during the earliest years of martial law. By 1982, the Philippines’ debt was at $24.4 billion, but it had not seen much in terms of returns because of corruption and the poor management of the crony-monopolized sectors of the economy.

In the third quarter of 1981, disaster for the Philippines came when the US economy went into recession, forcing the Reagan administration to increase interest rates. "Third world" countries like the Philippines and many of the nations of Latin America were highly debt dependent, and the size of their debt made debt servicing very difficult.

The Philippines’ exports could not keep up with the country’s debt, and the economy went into decline in 1981.

Economic impacts of the succession crisis and Aquino assassination   
This economic decline and a succession crisis brought about by Marcos' failing health convinced Marcos' political nemesis, Benigno Aquino Jr., to try to come back from exile to try and reason with Marcos to change his policies. But Aquino was gunned down at the airport before he could even touch Philippine soil. The already-declining Philippine economy suffered further as investors went to Indonesia, Malaysia, and Thailand instead of the Philippines.

Economic nosedive 
1984 and 1985 saw the worst recession in Philippine history, with the economy contracting by 7.3% for two successive years. Data from the Philippine Statistics Authority for 1985 showed that poverty incidence in families was at 44.2%—4.3 percentage points higher than in 1991 during the presidency of Corazon Aquino.

People Power Revolution 

With Marcos' health going into steady decline, he gradually lost the support of his cabinet, of the Military, and by some of his closest allies. He was finally ousted by the People Power Revolution that culminated from 22 to 25 February 1986.

See also 
 Ferdinand Marcos
 Martial law under Ferdinand Marcos
 Human rights abuses of the Marcos dictatorship
 Military history of the Philippines during the Marcos dictatorship

References 

Presidency of Ferdinand Marcos
Ferdinand Marcos, Economic history of the Philippines under